Nathan Hinton was a rugby league footballer for the Newcastle Knights of the National Rugby League. He played in the National Rugby League for two years before being leaving the Knights.

Playing career
Hailing from Newcastle, New South Wales, Hinton played his junior football for Western Suburbs Rosellas. He later played for the Newcastle Knights in 2006 and 2007.

References

1985 births
Living people
Australian rugby league players
Newcastle Knights players
Rugby league fullbacks
Rugby league players from Newcastle, New South Wales
Western Suburbs Rosellas players